Southside Story is the third studio album by American rapper Big Mello from Houston, Texas. It was released on August 13, 1996 via N-Terrorgation Records, and became the rapper's last album before he went on hiatus until 2002 and then died on June 15, 2002.

Track listing

Personnel
Curtis Donnell Davis – main artist, vocals, co-producer, mixing
Mo' Dangerous – background vocals, producer, mixing
Ronald Bookman – engineering, mixing, executive producer
Steven "Dope E" Baggett – scratches
Steve Ames – mixing
Clyde Bazile, Jr. – art direction
Deron Neblett – photography

References

External links

1996 albums
Big Mello albums